Rui Filipe Araújo Moreira (born 31 May 1996) is a Portuguese footballer who plays as a midfielder.

Football career
Born in Póvoa de Varzim, Moreira developed at hometown club Varzim S.C. before joining FC Porto at the age of 11. On 24 May 2015, he made his professional debut with FC Porto B in a 2014–15 Segunda Liga match against C.S. Marítimo B, a goalless draw. He played just over a third of the matches in 2015–16 as the reserve team won the second-tier championship, being ineligible for promotion to Primeira Liga.

On 31 August 2018, Moreira was loaned to Spanish club FC Cartagena, as was teammate Luís Mata. He played only four matches during his time with the Segunda División B club, one coming in the Copa del Rey.

Moreira ended his 12-year association with Porto in July 2019, when he returned to second-tier Varzim on a two-year deal.

References

External links

Stats and profile at LPFP 
National team data 

1996 births
Living people
People from Póvoa de Varzim
Portuguese footballers
Portuguese expatriate footballers
Association football midfielders
Liga Portugal 2 players
Segunda División B players
FC Porto B players
FC Cartagena footballers
Varzim S.C. players
Portugal youth international footballers
Portuguese expatriate sportspeople in Spain
Expatriate footballers in Spain
Sportspeople from Porto District